"Trumpsta" is the first major hit by Australian DJ and record producer Contiez. The single features Treyy G. It was released in May 2013 on the EP I'm Mr. Trumpsta, which contained the following remixes:

"Trumpsta" [Djuro Remix] (4:18)
"Trumpsta" [Mobin Master vs Tate Strauss Remix] (4:01)
"Trumpsta" [Dirty Palm Remix] (6:31)
"Trumpsta" [Stevie Mink Remix] (5:33)
"Trumpsta" [NYMZ Remix] (3:36)

Charts
The single reached number 3 in Sverigetopplistan, the official Swedish Singles Chart, and also charted in Norway, Denmark and Finland.

Weekly charts

Year-end charts

Certifications

References

2013 singles
2013 songs